Portage and Main is an intersection in downtown Winnipeg, Manitoba, Canada, located where Portage Avenue (Route 85) and Main Street (Route 52) intersect. The corner is known as the "crossroads of Canada", due to its relative proximity to the longitudinal centre of Canada.

Formally, Portage & Main is a designated neighbourhood including the blocks immediately surrounding the intersection, within larger Fort Rouge–East Fort Garry city ward.

History

The land upon which Portage and Main sits was originally purchased by Henry McKenney on 2 June 1862. He chose land where the north-south and east-west ox cart paths crossed, in order to build a general store with his half-brother John Christian Schultz.

Portage and Main is now the hub of some of Winnipeg's main transportation routes. It was once the centre for the banking industry in Western Canada. The national banks have branches accessible from beneath Portage and Main. It has served as a temporary city square and meeting place for parades and events, including the Winnipeg General Strike of 1919.

In 1974, the intersection was featured on an 8-cent stamp.

In 1976, the City of Winnipeg signed an agreement with private developers to open an underground concourse linking shopping malls under the four corner properties.  This included a 40-year deal to permanently close the pedestrian crossings at the intersection, which street works were completed around 1978. The concourse and walkways are currently connected through the Winnipeg Skywalk. The Portage and Main Circus houses a concrete sculptural wall created by Bruce Head.

On 13 August 1981, Portage and Main was the place where Dale Hawerchuk signed his contract with the Winnipeg Jets and later was the location of the "Save the Jets" rallies in 1995 and 1996.

In 2016, with the deal to close the intersection set to expire, city officials were contemplating re-opening of the intersection to pedestrians.  However, in a plebiscite in 2018, 65% of voters voted in favour of keeping the intersection closed to pedestrians, with many concerned about traffic congestion.  The mayor agreed to accept the results of that plebiscite and did not reopen the intersection.

More recently, Portage and Main has served as an anchor point for occasional street festivals and the winter lighting of holiday street decorations.

Weather

Portage and Main is the brunt of popular jokes referring to it as the coldest and windiest intersection in Canada.  The phrase Portage and Main has come to refer to the city of Winnipeg as a whole. The long-standing cold weather legend is unproven, because there are no official temperature measurements at any street corner in Canada to confirm the coldest intersection. Winnipeg's city centre is usually 3–4 °C warmer than the airport, owing to the urban heat island effect.

Cultural references

There are numerous cultural references to the intersection, including the 1992 Randy Bachman and Neil Young hit song “Prairie Town”, with the chorus repeating the line “Portage and Main, 50 below”. The British band Blurt have a song named “Portage & Main” on their album Kenny Rogers' Greatest Hit. It is also the setting for the Stompin' Tom Connors song "Red River Jane". In his song "Free in the Harbour," Canadian folk singer Stan Rogers referenced Portage and Main as a stop for fishermen from Hermitage Bay, Newfoundland on their way to find oil field work in "the hills of Alberta."

Portage and Main is a property on the Canadian Monopoly board, and was the inspiration for Fort Garry Brewing Company's "Portage and Main" India Pale Ale.

References

External links
 The Man Who Created the Corner of Portage and Main, Manitoba Historical Society Transactions

History of Winnipeg
Streets and squares in Winnipeg
Road junctions in Canada
Downtown Winnipeg